The solo discography of British musician Damon Albarn consists of four collaboration albums, four soundtrack albums, three extended plays and twelve singles. Also included are releases by Albarn's various side-projects and groups such as Mali Music, The Good the Bad & the Queen, Monkey, DRC Music and Rocket Juice & the Moon. Most of Albarn's work is either released by Honest Jon's Records (which is run by Albarn), Parlophone or EMI Records.

Since the late 1990s, Albarn began recording as a solo artist outside of Blur originally contributing music to film soundtracks such as Trainspotting (1996), Ravenous (1999), Ordinary Decent Criminal (2000) and 101 Reykjavík (2001). Aside from Gorillaz, Albarn has also recorded albums with various other side-projects and groups including Mali Music (2002) with Afel Bocoum, Toumani Diabaté and other Malian musicians, The Good, the Bad & the Queen with Tony Allen, Paul Simonon and Simon Tong, Kinshasa One Two (2011) as part of the collective DRC Music and Rocket Juice & the Moon (2012) with Tony Allen and Flea. Albarn has also composed the score for several theatre productions including Journey to the West (2008) recorded under the name Monkey and Dr Dee (2012).

Albums

Solo albums

Live albums

Collaboration albums

Soundtracks

EPs
 Democrazy (2003) (Double-EP of demos) 
 Live from SoHo (iTunes Exclusive EP) (2007) (as The Good, the Bad & the Queen) 
 Leave-Taking EP (2012) (as Rocket Juice & the Moon)

Singles

As lead artist

As featured artist

Music videos

Compilation appearances
 Trainspotting (1996) – "Closet Romantic"
 Random (1997) – "We Have a Technical" (with Matt Sharp)
 Ordinary Decent Criminal (2000) – "One Day at a Time" (with Robert Del Naja), "Kevin on a Motorbike", "Chase After Gallery", "Bank Job", "Dying Isn't Easy"
 This Is Where I Belong: The Songs of Ray Davies & The Kinks (2002) – "Waterloo Sunset" (with Ray Davies)
 Lucy (2014) – "Sister Rust"

Guest appearances
 Elastica – Elastica (1995) (keyboard on "Car Song", "Indian Song" & "Waking Up")
 The Pretenders – The Isle of View (1995) (piano on "I Go to Sleep")
 Terry Hall – Rainbows EP (1995) (on "Chasing a Rainbow")
 Terry Hall – Laugh (1997) (on "Room Full of Nothing")
 The Rentals – Seven More Minutes (2000) (on "Big Daddy C")
 Deltron 3030 – Deltron 3030 (2000) (on "State of the Nation" & "Time Keeps on Slipping")
 Elastica – The Menace (2000) (keyboard on "Da Da Da")
 Lovage – Music to Make Love to Your Old Lady By (2001) (on "Lovage (Love That Lovage, Baby)")
 Tony Allen – Home Cooking (2002) (on "Every Season")
 Terry Hall & Mushtaq – The Hour of Two Lights (2002)
 Massive Attack – 100th Window (2003) (on "Small Time Shot Away")
 Nathan Haines - Squire For Hire (2003) (on "Fm")
 Fatboy Slim – Palookaville (2004) (on "Put It Back Together")
 Roots Manuva – Awfully De/EP (2005) (on "Awfully Deep (Lambeth Blues)")
 Kano – London Town (2007) (on "Feel Free")
 U-Cef – Halalwood (2008) (on "Stick")
 The Black Ghosts – The Black Ghosts (2008) (on "Repetition Kills You")
 Eslam Jawaad – The Mammoth Tusk (2009) (on "Alarm Chord")
 Hypnotic Brass Ensemble – Hypnotic Brass Ensemble (2009) (synthesizer on "Rabbit Hop (Version)")
 Scratch – Loss 4 Wordz (2009) (on "Too Late")
Massive Attack – Heligoland (2010) (on “Splitting the Atom” and “Saturday Come Slow”)
 Gil Scott-Heron – I'm New Here (2010) (bass guitar on "Me and the Devil")
 Kano – Method to the Maadness (2010) (on "Bassment")
 Owiny Sigoma Band – Owiny Sigoma Band (2011)
 JJ Doom – Key to the Kuffs (2012) (on "Bite the Thong")
 Ghostigital – Division of Culture and Tourism (2012) (piano on "Numb")
 Deltron 3030 – Event 2 (2013) (on "What Is This Loneliness")
 Michael Horovitz – Nuclear Detergent Blues (piano on several songs)
 The Child of Lov – The Child of Lov (2013) (bass guitar on "Heal" and "One Day")
 Tony Allen – Film of Life (2014) (on "Go Back")
 De La Soul – And the Anonymous Nobody... (2016) (on "Here in After")
 Vince Staples – Big Fish Theory (2017) (on "Love Can Be...")
 Tony Allen – The Source (Blue Note, 2017) (on "Cool Cats")
 Kali Uchis - Isolation (2018) (on "In My Dreams")
 Romeo Elvis - Chocolat (2019) (on "Perdu")
 Slingbaum - Slingbaum One (2020) (on "Morphine")
 Flume - Palaces (2022) (on "Palaces")

Production discography
 Roots Manuva – Awfully De/EP (2005)
 Kano – London Town (2007)
 Abdel Hadi Halo – Abdel Hadi Halo & the El Gusto Orchestra of Algiers (2007)
 Amadou & Mariam – Welcome to Mali (2008) 
 Bobby Womack –  The Bravest Man in the Universe (2012)
 Damon Albarn – Everyday Robots (2014)

See also
 Blur discography
 The Good, the Bad & the Queen discography
 Gorillaz discography
 Graham Coxon discography

References

External links
 
 
 

Discographies of British artists
Alternative rock discographies
Discography